Baduspan (also spelled Badusban and Fadusban) was the name of a mountainous district located in the Alborz area of Tabaristan/Mazandaran, a region on the Caspian coast of northern Iran. It was a days walk south of the city of Sari.

References

Sources 
 

Mazandaran Province
Geographic history of Iran